Lenape Technical School is a public technical high school in Ford City, Pennsylvania.  It offers vocational training in 14 technical areas. Students attend Lenape Tech full-time or part-time for two or three years, 10th through 12th grade, and receive training in both their chosen technical field and in their complementary academic disciplines. Additionally, Lenape Tech offers job specific and personal improvement training programs for adults including a Practical Nursing Program.

External links 
 

Public high schools in Pennsylvania
Schools in Armstrong County, Pennsylvania